Carla Gonzalez (born November 5, 2001) is an American professional wrestler signed to WWE where she performs on the NXT brand under the ring name Roxanne Perez, where she is the current NXT Women's Champion in her first reign. She is a former NXT Women's Tag Team Champion. She is also known for her time with Ring of Honor where she was the inaugural ROH Women's World Champion under the ring name Rok-C.

Professional wrestling career

Independent circuit and Ring of Honor (2018–2022) 
Gonzalez began training at age 13, and later trained under Booker T starting at age 16. She made her pro wrestling debut in December 2018 under the ring name Rok-C as she began wrestling for Booker T's promotion Reality of Wrestling. Her ring name derives from The Rock – as she was a fan of his, she "kind of switched up the letters a little bit, and then I use the dash… The C stands for my name, Carla." Rok-C spent the majority of her rookie years wrestling for promotions across her home state of Texas, most notably for ROW where she won the women's title, the ROW Diamonds Division Championship.

In April 2021, Rok-C made her Ring of Honor debut, teaming with Max the Impaler in a time limit draw against Laynie Luck and Hyan. Rok-C then competed in the ROH Women's World Championship tournament, where she defeated the likes of Sumie Sakai, Quinn McKay, and Angelina Love. In the finals at Death Before Dishonor XVIII, she defeated Miranda Alize to become the inaugural ROH Women's World Champion and youngest female champion in company history at 19. Her first title defense was on the November 26 episode of Ring of Honor Wrestling, where she defeated Gia Scott. At Final Battle, she retained her championship against Willow Nightingale in what was ROH's last pay-per-view event before going on hiatus. During post match, she was confronted by former Impact Knockouts Champion and reigning AAA Reina de Reinas Champion Deonna Purrazzo who proposed a winner take all match at a future Impact Wrestling event. The match took place on the January 13 episode of Impact!, where she lost the ROH Women's World Championship against Purrazzo, who also put the AAA Reina de Reinas title on the line.

WWE (2022–present) 
In March 2022, it was confirmed that Gonzalez had signed a contract with WWE's developmental brand NXT and changed her ring name to Roxanne Perez. Perez made her WWE debut on the April 15 episode of NXT Level Up where she defeated Sloane Jacobs. She made her first NXT appearance on April 19, defeating Jacy Jayne. In May and June, Perez participated in the NXT Women's Breakout Tournament, and won by defeating Tiffany Stratton in the finals and earned a contract for a championship opportunity for a title of her choosing. At The Great American Bash, Perez and Cora Jade defeated Toxic Attraction (Gigi Dolin and Jayne) to become NXT Women's Tag Team Champions. The next week, Perez cashed in her guaranteed title shot on Mandy Rose for the NXT Women's Championship in a title match, but Jade turned on her and cost Perez's championship opportunity. The following episode, Jade threw her championship belt in the garbage; as a result, WWE then recognized Perez as continuing to hold the titles by herself, but the following week she vacated the title as well. This led into a match between Jade and Perez on August 16 at Heatwave where Jade was victorious, after distracting Perez during the match. On the October 4 episode of NXT, a Weapons Wild match was set between Jade and Perez on Halloween Havoc. The two also agreed on pick your poison matches, where both could choose any opponent in WWE for each other. Perez made her first main roster appearance on the October 14 episode of SmackDown, where she picked Raquel Rodriguez as Jade's opponent. The two later teamed with Shotzi in a losing effort against Damage CTRL (Bayley and WWE Women's Tag Team Champions Dakota Kai and Iyo Sky). On the October 18 episode of NXT, Perez lost to Rhea Ripley, who Jade chose to face against Perez in the pick your poison match. Four days later, at Halloween Havoc, Perez defeated Jade in a Weapons Wild match. At Deadline, Perez won the inaugural Iron Survivor Challenge and three days later, defeated Mandy Rose to win the NXT Women's Championship. 

Perez entered her first Royal Rumble match at the titular event on January 28, 2023. She entered as the eighth entrant and lasted for more than four minutes before being eliminated by Damage CTRL (Bayley, Dakota Kai, and Iyo Sky). At Vengeance Day, Perez retained the title against Gigi Dolin and Jacy Jayne in a triple threat match. She then defended her title against Meiko Satomura at Roadblock. After the match, she collapsed and was stretchered out.

Other media 
Gonzalez made her video game debut as a playable character in WWE 2K23.

Personal life 
Gonzalez has cited AJ Lee and The Rock as her favorite wrestlers and inspirations.

Championships and accomplishments 
 New Texas Pro Wrestling
 New Texas Pro Women's Championship (1 time)
 Pro Wrestling Illustrated
 Ranked No. 28 of the top 150 female wrestlers in the PWI Women's 150 in 2021
 Renegade Wrestling Revolution
 RWR Vixens Champion (1 time)
 Ring of Honor
 ROH Women's World Championship (1 time)
 ROH Women's World Championship Tournament (2021)
 ROH Year-End Award (2 times)
 Female Wrestler of the Year (2021)
 Best New Star (2021)
 Reality of Wrestling
 ROW Diamonds Division Championship (1 time)
 Sabotage Wrestling
 Sabotage War of the Genders Championship (1 time)
 WWE
 NXT Women's Championship (1 time, current)
 NXT Women's Tag Team Championship (1 time) – with Cora Jade
 NXT Women's Breakout Tournament (2022)

References

External links 

 
 
 
 

2001 births
Living people
People from Laredo, Texas
American female professional wrestlers
Professional wrestlers from Texas
21st-century American women
21st-century professional wrestlers
NXT Women's Champions
NXT Women's Tag Team Champions
ROH Women's World Champions